Nicole Margaret Fiorentino (born April 7, 1979) is an American bass guitarist.  Originally a touring member of the alternative rock band The Smashing Pumpkins (replacing Ginger Pooley and her temporary replacement Mark Tulin), she became an official member in 2010. She performs on the band's third Teargarden by Kaleidyscope EP (2011) and subsequent album Oceania (2012). Fiorentino departed the band in 2014.

Biography
Fiorentino was born in Ludlow, Massachusetts.  Prior to joining the Smashing Pumpkins, she was a member of Radio Vago, Chicago alternative act Veruca Salt, Spinnerette, Twilight Sleep, and Light FM, the last of which opened for Billy Corgan's one-off band Backwards Clock Society in November 2009.

Within a February 17, 2011 post on Smashing Pumpkins' Facebook page, Fiorentino claimed she was one of the girls on the cover of the Pumpkins' 1993 album Siamese Dream. Although it was received by many fans to have been in jest, several news sources and a portion of the fan community believed this to be a genuine claim. Rolling Stone suggested that Corgan had "decided to pull a Twitter prank". Former SmashingPumpkins.com webmaster, Paul Friemel, later claimed that both cover models had been located in 2007 and that neither was Fiorentino.

In 2010, Fiorentino began working with Meghan Toohey under the group name The Cold and Lovely. In 2012 their debut album was released after it was funded through Kickstarter. The album produced one single and video for the song "Not With Me" released on April 24. The following year, on September 24, 2013, The Cold and Lovely released their sophomore record entitled "Ellis Bell EP".

In October 2013, Australian art rock band The Red Paintings announced Fiorentino would be performing with them as part of their new 'Wasps' stage show premiere live on AXS TV, October 7.

Fiorentino spent most of 2014 working with The Cold and Lovely. The group played a SXSW tour, supporting the re-release their Ellis Bell EP. They recorded a follow-up EP with new songs. They went on a summer tour of the U.S. East Coast. In May 2014, Fiorentino provided backing vocals to London band, The Microdance's début album New Waves of Hope. In the fall of 2014, Fiorentino joined the band Night Terrors of 1927 on their fall tour. In September 2014, Corgan stated in an interview with Alternative Nation that both Fiorentino and bandmate Mike Byrne were no longer members of The Smashing Pumpkins, citing different levels of commitment to the Smashing Pumpkins. However, Fiorentino and Corgan remain on amicable terms.

Personal life
Since 2012, Fiorentino has been married to her bandmate Meghan Toohey. Fiorentino, who identifies as queer, did not publicly disclose her sexuality until 2015, saying "The whole time I was in the Smashing Pumpkins, I was very vocal about my feelings on gay rights, but I never discussed it in terms of my own experiences. I just wasn't ready at that point for my own reasons."

Discography

With The Smashing Pumpkins
Teargarden by Kaleidyscope (2011)
Oceania (2012)
Oceania: Live in NYC (2013)

With Cold and Lovely
The Cold and Lovely (2012)
Ellis Bell EP (2013)
What Have I Become (2015)
With The Microdance
New Waves of Hope (2015)

With Veruca Salt
IV (2006)

With Light FM
Let There Be Light FM (2009)
Buzz Kill City (2011)

References

External links

1979 births
American rock bass guitarists
Women bass guitarists
American LGBT musicians
Queer musicians
Queer women
Living people
American people of Italian descent
The Smashing Pumpkins members
People from Ludlow, Massachusetts
Guitarists from Massachusetts
American alternative rock musicians
Alternative rock bass guitarists
LGBT people from Massachusetts
Veruca Salt members
21st-century American women musicians
21st-century American bass guitarists